The Vel-Tones was a 1950s American band whose members included Tommy McLain and country singer Clint West. The band recorded as Bob Shurley & The Vel-Tones, Red Smiley & the Veltones and Bob and the Veltones.

The group is no relation to the soul group The Veltones.

References

Living people
American musical groups
Year of birth missing (living people)